The Ancil Twitchell House, at 100 S. 200 East in Beaver, Utah was listed on the National Register of Historic Places in 1984.

It was built for Ancil Twitchell in 1888 as a one-and-a-half-story house with end-wall chimneys, upon a black rock (basalt) foundation.  It has elements of Greek Revival in its decoration, including in the wooden pediments above windows and the front door, and in the cornice along the eaves.  A one-story brick extension to the rear was added c.1909-11.

It was deemed "significant because it helps to document the pervasive nature of this house form, a house considered by local residents an  symbol of prosperity and achievement."

References

National Register of Historic Places in Beaver County, Utah
Greek Revival architecture in Utah
Houses completed in 1888